Moldovans, sometimes referred to as Moldavians (Moldovan Cyrillic: молдовень), is a term used to describe the Romanian-speaking indigenous people of the Republic of Moldova and the largest self-declared ethnic group of the Republic of Moldova (75.1% of the population as of 2014) as well as a significant minority in Ukraine and Russia. There is an ongoing controversy, in part involving the linguisitic definition of ethnicity, over whether Moldovans' self-identification constitutes an ethnic group distinct and apart from Romanians, or a subset.

Self-identified Moldovans are a majority in the Republic of Moldova (75.1% of the population as of 2014) and a significant minority in Ukraine and Russia, including in Transnistria and the diaspora originating from these regions. Self-identified Romanians in the Republic of Moldova vary  (2.1 % self-identified as Romanians in 2004 and 7% of the population of Moldova self-identified as Romanians in 2014).

The variant Moldavians is also used to refer to all inhabitants of the territory of historical Principality of Moldavia, currently divided among Romania (47.5%), Moldova (30.5%) and Ukraine (22%), regardless of their ethnic identity. In Romania, natives of Western Moldavia identifying with the term generally declare Romanian ethnicity, while the Moldovans from Bessarabia (the Republic of Moldova included) are usually called "Bessarabians".

History

According to Miron Costin, a prominent chronicler from 17th-century Moldavia, the inhabitants of the Principality of Moldavia spoke Romanian and called themselves "Moldavians", but also "Romanians" which, he notes, comes from "romanus". Also, the Slavic neighbours called Moldovans "Vlachs" or "Volokhs", a term also used to refer to all native Romance speakers from Eastern Europe and the Balkan peninsula.

In 1812, the Russian Empire annexed the eastern half of Moldavia and renamed it Bessarabia. As the ethnonym "Romanian" was gaining more and more popularity throughout the remaining territory of Moldavia and Bukovina during the 19th century, its dissemination in Bessarabia, a more backward and rural province of the Russian Empire at the time, was welcomed mostly by the Romanian-oriented intellectuals, while the majority of the rural population continued to use the old self-identification "Moldovans".

Some authors observe that the Russian officials also initially preferred to refer to the native inhabitants of Bessarabia as "Romanians" (or "Volochi"), but after the 1859 unification of Moldavia and Wallachia they gradually began using the term "Moldavians" for them, to justify the idea of Russifiers and Pan-Slavists to create an identity different from that of the Romanians of Western Moldavia. Historian van Meurs however indicates that some Russian official documents and scholarly studies in the 19th century actually continued to use both "Romanians" and "Moldavians" when referring to the local population, noting that the Russian policy which restricted the use of the Romanian language in Bessarabia was rather part of the general tendency of Russification and of promotion of a tsarist nationality policy as such.

Van Meurs concludes that before the October Revolution the inhabitants of Bessarabia probably considered themselves "Moldavians" in a "natural, primarily local-territorial sense", and there had been no consistent government-sponsored effort to influence the local nation-building process by promoting a Moldavian identity. Likewise, Historian Charles King notes that the Moldovan peasant's view of his own national identity was not the product of Russian assimilationist policies but had instead remained virtually frozen since 1812.

Until the 1920s, historians generally considered Moldovans as a subgroup of the Romanian ethnos. After 1924, within the newly created Moldavian Autonomous Soviet Socialist Republic, Soviet authorities supported the creation of a different standardized language (see Moldovan language) allegedly in order to prove that Moldovans form a separate ethnic group.

In the past, the terms "Moldovan" or "Moldavian" have been used to refer to the population of the historical Principality of Moldavia. However, for the inhabitants of Bessarabia living under the Russian rule, the term gained an ethnic connotation by the beginning of the 20th century: in May 1917, at a congress of Bessarabian teachers, a dispute arose over the identification of the native population; a group protested against being called "Romanians", affirming they were "Moldovan", while another group, led by poet Alexei Mateevici, supported the view that the Moldovans are also Romanians.

In 1918, Bessarabia joined the Kingdom of Romania, following a vote of Sfatul Țării. The circumstance of the vote was itself complex, since the Romanian troops were present in Bessarabia at the request of the Sfatul Țării as it was facing exterior threats and anarchy.

By the time of the union, the largely illiterate Romanian-speaking peasants of Bessarabia did not consider themselves part of a larger Romanian nation, and there was no mass nationalist movement as in other regions, such as in Transylvania.

The unified Romanian state promoted a common identity for all its Romanian-speaking inhabitants. Owing partly to its relative underdevelopment compared to other regions of Greater Romania, as well as to the low competence and corruption of the new Romanian administration in this province, the integration process of Bessarabia in the unified Romanian state was less successful than in other regions and was soon to be disrupted by the Soviet occupation.

In 1940, during World War II, Romania agreed to an ultimatum and ceded the region to the Soviet Union, which organized it into the Moldavian SSR. The Soviets began a campaign to promote the Moldovan identity overt that of the rest of Romanian speakers, taking advantage of the incomplete integration of the Bessarabia into the interwar Romania (see also Moldovenism). The official Soviet policy also stated that Romanian and Moldovan were two different languages and, to emphasize this distinction, Moldovan had to be written in a new Cyrillic alphabet (the Moldovan Cyrillic alphabet) based on the Russian Cyrillic, rather than the older Romanian Cyrillic that ceased to be used in the 19th century in the Romanian Old Kingdom and in 1917 in Bessarabia.

Identity and politics in the Republic of Moldova

A survey carried out in the Republic of Moldova in 1992 showed that 87% of the Romanian/Moldovan speakers chose to identify themselves as "Moldovans", rather than "Romanians".

According to a study conducted in the Republic of Moldova in May 1998, when the self-declared Moldovans were asked to characterize the relationship of the Romanian and Moldovan identities, 55% considered them somewhat different, 26% very different and less than 5% identical.

A poll conducted in the Republic of Moldova by IMAS-Inc Chișinău in October 2009 presented a more detailed picture. The respondents were asked to rate the relationship between the Romanian and Moldovan identities on a scale between 1 (entirely the same) to 5 (completely different). The poll showed that 26% of the entire sample, which included all ethnic groups, claimed the two identities were the same or very similar, whereas 47% claimed they were different or entirely different.

The results varied significantly among different categories of subjects. For instance, while 33% of the young respondents (ages from 18 to 29 years) chose the same or very similar and 44% different or very different, among the senior respondents (aged over 60 years) the corresponding figures were 18.5% and 53%. The proportion of those who chose the same or very similar identity was higher than the average among the native speakers of Romanian/Moldovan (30%), among the urban dwellers (30%), among those with higher education (36%), and among the residents of the capital city (42%).

According to an 2020 OSCE-sponsored study, among the population of Moldova, 20% of ethnic Moldovans secondarily identified as Romanians, while 68% of ethnic Romanians secondarily identified as Moldovans. When asked about their mother tongue, among ethnic Moldovans 69% identified it as Moldovan, 34% as Romanian, and 7% as Russian (multiple answers were allowed). The study indicated ethnic Moldovans are highly endogamous, with 87% reporting a spouse of the same ethnic groups; in contrast, 50% of the Romanians indicated a Moldovan spouse. While 91% of the ethnic Moldovans reported having Moldavian parents of either sex, among ethnic Romanians 52% indicated having a Moldovan mother (as opposed to 45% having a Romanian one), while 49% indicated having a Moldovan father (as opposed to 50% having a Romanian one).

Also the major Moldovan political forces have diverging opinions regarding the identity of Moldovans. This contradiction is reflected in their stance towards the national history that should be taught in schools. Governing forces such as the Liberal Party, Liberal Democratic Party, and Our Moldova Alliance support the teaching of the history of Romanians. Others, such as the Democratic Party and the Party of Communists support the history of the Republic of Moldova.

The diverging opinions are also reflected in the official state documents issued in successive legislatures. The Declaration of Independence of 1991 calls the official language "Romanian", and the first anthem adopted by the independent Republic of Moldova was "Deşteaptă-te, române" ("Awaken thee, Romanian!"), the same as the anthem of Romania.

Mirroring different political configurations of the later Moldovan Parliament, the Constitution of Moldova (1994) calls the official language "Moldovan", while the "Concept of the National Policy of the Republic of Moldova" (2003) adopted by the Communist-dominated Parliament distinguishes explicitly Moldovans and Romanians as ethnic groups, and so does the census of 2004.

On December 5, 2013, the Constitutional Court of the Republic of Moldova ruled that the Romanian language is the official language of this country, in agreement with the Declaration of Independence of 1991.

Intellectuals of Bessarabia and the Romanian identity
A significant number of intellectuals from the Bessarabia considered themselves part of the Romanian nation in the passing of time. Amongst these prominent figures, there are the following ones:

 Alexei Mateevici (1888–1917), author of the Moldovan national anthem Limba noastră said at a congress of Bessarabian teachers in 1917: "Yes, we are Moldovans, sons of the old Moldavia, but we belong to the large body of the Romanian nation, that lives in Romania, Bukovina and Transylvania. Our brothers from Bukovina, Transylvania and Macedonia don't call themselves after the places they live in, but call themselves Romanians. That is what we should do as well!"
 Emanoil Catelli (1883–1943) a politician of the Moldavian Democratic Republic, and later of Romania, said in 1917: "The Moldovans who remained silent for 106 years, should speak louder today [...] because they are Romanians, and only the Russians demoted them to the role of 'Moldovans.'"
 Maria Cebotari (1910–1949) one of the most famous sopranos born in Bessarabia said "Never and in no circumstance has it crossed my mind to say that I am anything else than a Romanian from Bessarabia, or, simply, a Romanian."
 Grigore Vieru (1935–2009), prominent Moldovan poet, a staunch supporter of Pan-Romanianism, wrote: "Moldovans hurt me too/Inhumanly/But I'm happy that Romanianness/Still lives in them" (Bessarabia with Sorrow)
 Eugen Doga (b. 1937), a famous Moldovan composer, explained in an interview his visit to Alba-Iulia, Romania: "This is the capital of the unification, a real Mecca [...]. I think people come here not forced, but freely, for a return to their brothers."
 Gheorghe Duca (b. 1952), president of the Moldovan Academy of Sciences said: "Just like the whole Romanian nation, that Grigore Vieru praised, I cannot believe the Poet left home forever"
Constantin Tănase (b. 1949), director of the Moldovan newspaper "Timpul de dimineață", one of the most influential opinion leaders from Moldova  stated: "The academia, the political and cultural elite has to show that Romanianness in the Republic of Moldova is not an extremist whim, but a reality and a condition of the existence of this state."

The resolution of the "Association of Historians from the Republic of Moldova" (AIRM) from October 28, 2009 in favor of teaching the history of Romanians in Moldovan schools reads "The people of the Moldovan SSR were subjected to the Communist ideology, with the aim of replacing the Romanian identity of the native population, with one newly created".

The welcome message of the Union of Writers from Moldova is a quote from Mircea Eliade: "We invite you to become initiated in the literary life of Bessarabia, border Romanian land subjected to a long, too long terror of history".

The national poet of Moldova and Romania, Mihai Eminescu was born and lived outside of the territory of the current Republic of Moldova and considered himself Romanian. He is often quoted as saying "We are Romanians, period. (Suntem români şi punct)".

Demographics

The 2014 census reported an estimated 2,998,235 people (without Transnistria), out of which 2,804,801 were actually covered by the census. Among them, 2,068,068 or 73.7% declared themselves Moldovans and 192,800 or 6.9% Romanians. Some organisations like the Liberal party of Moldova have criticised the census results, claiming Romanians comprise 85% of the population and that census officials have pressured respondents to declare themselves Moldovans instead of Romanians and have purposefully failed to cover urban respondents who are more likely to declare themselves Romanians as opposed to Moldovans.

The previous 2004 census results reported that out of the 3,383,332 people living in Moldova (without Transnistria), 2,564,849 or 75.81% declared themselves Moldovans and only 73,276 or 2.17% Romanians. A group of international observers considered the census was generally conducted in a professional manner, although they reported several cases when enumerators encouraged respondents to declare themselves Moldovans rather than Romanians.

The 2001 census in Ukraine counted 258,600 Moldovans and 150,989 Romanians. The self-identified Moldovans live mostly in the southern and northern areas of historical Bessarabia (specifically in the Budjak region of Odessa Oblast and in Novoselytsia Raion of Chernivtsi Oblast), whereas the self-identified Romanians live mostly in Northern Bukovina and Hertsa region of Chernivtsi Oblast.

In Russia, 156,400 Moldovans have been counted in the 2010 Russian census. They are concentrated mostly in Moscow, but also in some rural areas in Kuban, southern Siberia, and the Russian Far East, where they migrated or were deported generations ago. Around 14,000 Moldovans live in Kazakhstan, mostly in the former capital Almaty, but also in some rural areas in the northern parts of the country.

Regional identity in Romania

The largest share (47.5%) of the territory of the historical Principality of Moldavia together with all its formal capitals (Târgul Moldovei, Suceava, and Iaşi) and the famous painted churches are located in Romania. The river Moldova (possibly, the origin of the name of the Principality, see Etymology of Moldova) now flows entirely through Romania. After the Russian annexation of Bessarabia in 1812, and Austrian annexation of Bukovina in 1775, the rest of Moldavia united in 1859 with Wallachia and formed the modern Romania.

According to the Romanian census of 2002, there are 4.7 million Romanian speakers in the eight counties that were once part of the Principality of Moldavia. The number of people, if any, who possibly declared themselves as Moldavians in this census is impossible to know, since "Moldavian" is officially considered a regional identity in Romania and respondents were recorded as "Romanians". The Romanian-speaking inhabitants of these counties generally refer to themselves as "Moldavians", but declare Romanian ethnicity.

In 1998, Constantin Simirad, the former mayor of Iaşi founded the Party of the Moldavians (Partidul Moldovenilor) which later joined the Social Democratic Party. However, the party's declared objective was to represent the interests of the Moldavia region in Romania rather than any ethnic identification.

In February 2007, a small group of Romanian citizens who created the "Moldovan/Moldavian Community in Romania" (Comunitatea moldovenilor din România) attempted unsuccessfully to gain recognition of the minority status for Moldovans from Romania. The organization was initially registered legally, but the decision was soon reverted. Around the same time, during a visit to Moldova, three delegates met with President Vladimir Voronin, who promised them his support. Being denied legal recognition the Community eventually dissolved.

Religion in Moldova

The major denomination in Moldova is Eastern Orthodox Christianity. The majority of Moldovan Orthodox Christians belong to the Moldovan Orthodox Church, a branch of the Russian Orthodox Church, while a minority belongs to the Metropolis of Bessarabia, a branch of the Romanian Orthodox Church. Both bodies are in full communion, the dispute between them being purely territorial and revolves around the legitimate succession of the interwar Metropolitan See of Bessarabia. As of 2007, the Moldovan Orthodox Church has 1255 parishes, while the Metropolis of Bessarabia has 219.

See also

 Ethnogenesis
 Romanian dialects
 Movement for the unification of Romania and Moldova
 Moldovan diaspora
 Moldovan Americans
 Moldovans in Ukraine

References

Sources

Further reading
 Matthew H. Ciscel (2007) The Language of the Moldovans: Romania, Russia, and Identity in an Ex-Soviet Republic",  - About the identity of the contemporary Moldovans in the context of debates about their language.
 King, C. (2000) The Moldovans: Romania, Russia and the Politics of Culture, Hoover Institution Press, .

 
Ethnic groups in Moldova
Romance peoples
Ethnic groups in Russia
Ethnic groups in Ukraine
Eastern Romance people
Controversy over ethnic and linguistic identity in Moldova